Townsley is a surname. Notable people with the surname include:

Andrew Townsley (born 1952), first class cricketer who played for Yorkshire County Cricket Club in 1974 and 1975
Barry Townsley CBE (born 1946), British stockbroker
Clarence Page Townsley (1855–1926), United States Army officer, superintendent of the United States Military Academy
Derek Townsley (born 1973), English professional footballer
Joel Townsley Rogers (1896–1984), American writer who wrote science-fiction, air-adventure, and mystery stories
Tom Townsley (1898–1976), Scottish footballer
Simon Townsley (born 1963), Photojournalist, British Press Photographer of the Year 1991 and 1995